

This is a list of the National Register of Historic Places listings in Claiborne County, Tennessee.

This is intended to be a complete list of the properties and districts on the National Register of Historic Places in Claiborne County, Tennessee, United States. Latitude and longitude coordinates are provided for many National Register properties and districts; these locations may be seen together in a map.

There are 12 properties and districts in the county are listed on the National Register.  Another two properties were once listed but have been removed.

Current listings

|}

Former listing

|}

See also

 List of National Historic Landmarks in Tennessee
 National Register of Historic Places listings in Tennessee

References

Claiborne